Facundo Mario Olezza Bazán (born 30 August 1994 in San Isidro) is an Argentine sailor. He placed ninth in the Finn event at the 2016 Summer Olympics. He competed at the 2020 Summer Olympics were he came sixth.

Notes

References

External links
 
 
 
 

1994 births
Living people
Finn class sailors
Argentine male sailors (sport)
Olympic sailors of Argentina
Sailors at the 2016 Summer Olympics – Finn
Sailors at the 2020 Summer Olympics – Finn
People from San Isidro, Buenos Aires
Sportspeople from Buenos Aires Province